Behala is a locality of South West Kolkata, in the Indian state of West Bengal. Behala is a part of Kolkata Municipal Corporation area. It is broadly spread across Ward Nos. 118, 119, 120, 121, 122, 123, 124, 125, 126, 127, 128, 129, 130, 131 and 132 of the Kolkata Municipal Corporation and is divided into two Vidhan Sabha constituencies: Behala Paschim and Behala Purba. Behala, Parnasree, Thakurpukur, Haridevpur and Sarsuna police stations serve this area under the South West Division of Kolkata Police also known as Behala Division (The division comprises Behala, Sarsuna, Haridevpur, Thakurpukur, Parnasree and Taratola).

Behala is one of the oldest residential areas of the city. The Sabarna Roy Choudhury's, one of the oldest zamindar families of western Bengal and the trustee of Kalighat Kali Temple lives here. It is also home to Sourav Ganguly, former Indian national cricket captain and Sovan Chatterjee, the former Mayor of Kolkata.

The Durga Puja celebration of Sabarna Roy Choudhury family at Barisha was launched in 1610 by Laksmikanta Majumdar, making it the second oldest family Durga Puja in western Bengal. Today Durga Puja at Behala is marked by exotic theme-based sarbojanin pujas. Barisha Chandi Mela is a 10-day fair held every year in November–December since 1792.

Etymology

The word Behala is commonly believed to have its root in Behula, the name of the female protagonist of Manasamangalkavya. Alternatively, the name may have been derived from the Bengali term Bahulapur ("land of many rivers" or "dark city"). "Bahula" is also an epithet of the goddesses Chandi and Kali. Rev. James Long, who used to live in this parts, described Behala as Byala in one of his early writings. It is also known that Behala comprised many small villages before the whole place was urbanised and each village here had a suffix -behala with its name i.e. Bazarbehala, Tamtelbehala, Bnorshebehala (Barisha), Sorshunnobehala (Sarsuna) etc. Names like Rajarbaganbehala, Sahapurbehala, Naskarpurbehala and Santoshbatibehala are also found in the old proceedings of South Suburban Municipality.

History

Modern day 

Behala encompasses one of the largest suburban agglomerations of the city of Kolkata. It consists of many small localities like Sahapur, New Alipore (partially), Parnasree Pally, Behala Bazaar, Manton, Behala Chowrasta (Barisha), Muchipara, Sakherbazaar, Silpara, Bakultala, Shakuntala Park, Kadamtala, Thakurpukur, Haridevpur, Dakshin Behala,  Sarsuna and Joka. Huge growth of population especially since the early eighties resulted in the area being on the radar of both the daily wage earners, common populace and educated classes. Due to this enormous and unplanned growth, the traffic is by and large dependent on the arterial Diamond Harbour Road, in spite of the availability of the parallel James Long Sarani (Commonly known as Rail Line since the old and now defunct Kalighat Falta Railway ran here) as an option. During the construction the Taratala flyover, a large portion of traffic flowed through James Long Sarani to avoid construction activity, causing development of other areas of Behala.

Encroachments by street-hawkers of the sidewalks on both sides of the busy Diamond Harbour Road is a major problem. Areas like Behala Bazar, Behala Chowrasta and Behala Sakherbazaar have been added to the 'Calcutta Green Zone' and traffic moves at a snail's pace during the peak office hours.

Previously there were tram lines along the middle of Diamond Harbour Road from Joka to Mominpur and often people used the trams to go to Esplanade. The service on this stretch has been withdrawn now. Mominpur to Behala Bazaar service was closed in 2006 due to the Taratala flyover. Behala Bazaar to Joka service was also closed in 2011 due to the elevated metro railway construction on the Diamond Harbour road, which will run from Joka to Esplanade (Kolkata Metro Line 3).

SL Dhanuka Girls' hostel that has come up at Behala on Diamond Harbour Road, inaugurated on 24 March 2017 by the Chief minister of Bengal Mamata Banerjee.

Geography

Police district
The localities of behala area are served by South West Division (Behala Division) of Kolkata Police. It includes Taratala Police station, Behala Police station, Thakurpukur Police Station, Parnashree Police station, Sarsuna Police station and Haridevpur Police station.

Behala Women police station, located at the same address as Behala Police station, covers all police districts under the jurisdiction of the South West division i.e. Sarsuna, Taratala, Behala, Parnasree, Thakurpukur and Haridevpur.

Transport
Various buses are available to move around Behala to Kolkata. The recent collapse of the Majerhat Bridge which was one of the major roads connecting Behala to the rest of Calcutta has led to massive traffic snarls in the area. Now, a new bridge has been made which successfully connects Behala with other areas.

Tram

Trams used to be popular vehicles for commuting to and from several parts of Behala, but of late the trend has seen a reversal for their slow speed. After the construction of Taratala flyover, the only truncated tram service from Behala Bazaar to Joka became deplorable and finally closed as a result of the Esplanade-Joka Metro Project.

Railway

Behala is served by Majherhat, Brace Bridge and New Alipore railway station on the Sealdah South section of Kolkata Suburban Railway.

Behala was also served by Gholesapur and Sakherbazar railway station of Kalighat Falta Railway (KFR), which has been closed in 1957.

Airport

Behala Airport more commonly referred as Behala Flying Training Institute (BFTI) or Behala Flying Club (BFC) is the second of the two airports in the Kolkata Metropolitan Area and other being the Netaji Subhas Chandra Bose International Airport. There are plans to upgrade the airport. Recently a helicopter service has been started to connect Kolkata with Durgapur by air.

Metro Railway 
Former President Ms. Pratibha Patil laid the foundation stone of Joka to Esplanade Metro Rail Project (Kolkata Metro Line 3) in presence of Union Finance Minister and Governor of West Bengal in September, 2010.

The metro has partially started from Joka to Taratala, and has been inaugurated by Prime Minister of India Narendra Modi on 30 December, 2022.
Currently six stations are active that are Joka Metro Station, Thakurpukur Metro Station, Sakherbazar Metro Station, Behala Chowrasta Metro Station, Behala Bazaar Metro Station and Taratala Metro Station.

The construction of Majherhat Metro Station is expected to be completed by 2024.

Festivals

Barisha Chandi Mela, a 10-day fair held every year in November–December since 1792, attracts people from all over the city. There are various stalls, rides and plenty of shops for people of all age groups. On some days during the fair, the crowd count crosses One Lakh as well. Many popular artists also perform during this festival.

During Christmas, all Behala roads lead to St. Peter's Church, CNI located inside the Oxford Mission compound ,Infant Jesus Church located next to Ellora Cinema hall, Sacred Heart Church and many other churches located near Behala and Thakurpukur.

A big Rath Yatra festival and mela also occur every year on Diamond harbour road, Thakurpukur. The festival and mela starts from day of Ratha Yatra and the mela ends at the day of Ulta Ratha Yatra.

Rath made of brass of sonar Durga Bari made in 1871, is bring outside every year during Rath Yatra Celebration.
Jagatdhatri Puja is also celebrated in many Localities of Behala.

Just Like rest of Kolkata, Behala is also famous for Durga Puja, some of the popular Durga Puja pandals are 
 Behala Notun Dal
 Behala Adarshapally
 Behala KFR Math Durga Puja
 Behala Shree Sangha
 Behala Trishakti Club
 Behala Nafar Chandra Das Road
 Behala Jadu and Mitra Colony
 Behala Friends.
 Barisha Club
 Behala 11 pally
 Haridevpur 41 pally
 Thakurpukur State Bank Park
 The most Traditional puja is held at Roy House, at Roy Bahadur Road. SABORNO ROY CHOWDHURY HOUSE and Behala Sonar Durga Bari.

The biggest celebration of the festival of Eid is held at Behala 18 Bigha Masjid.

Business
The Diamond Harbour Road is dotted on both sides with shops and eateries. Clothes, jewellery, electronic items, sports goods, books and footwear can be found in a multitude of stores all along the stretch from Taratala to Manton. Recent additions to the shopping scene include shopping malls and factory outlets.

Apart from the standard stores, the pavements of Behala are crowded with hawkers selling everything from toothpicks to bedsheets. Some popular shops of Behala are Panna Sweets, Panna Restaurant, Haji Saheb, Bhaskar and Sriniketan, new Ladies Own(Behala Tramdepot), RamKrishna Sarighar, Debnath Electric, Shilpalay, Tanishq, P.C. Chandra Jewellers, Titan, Aminiah, Arsalan, Zeeshan, Feardeal, Great Eastern, Frankfros, Bata, Khadims, Dhannwentari Adidas Showroom (Silpara), Thakurpukur Reliance Complex and many more.

Some popular commercial offices in Behala are BSNL, CESE, Behala Industrial Area, Patton Tank, East India Pharmaceuticals, Union drugs, BG Press, Taratala Mint, Brand Factory, Alankrita Careers and many more.

Grocery Markets
Behala has enormous number of fresh food markets usually termed as "Bazaar", where fresh vegetables, fish, meat, spices, and other food items are available. Some important Bazaars within Behala are :- 
Behala Bazaar
Puraton Bazaar
Sodepur Bazaar
Goragacha Bazaar
Senhati Bazaar
Simultala Bazaar
Thakurpukur Bazaar
Kabardanga Fish Market
Buroshibtala Bazaar
B.G press Food Market
Bakultala Bazaar
Behala Chowrasta Bazaar
Sakher Bazaar
Kadamtala Bazaar
Keorapukur Bazaar
Anandanagar Bazaar
Dakhin Behala Sasthir More Bazaar 
LIC Bazaar Barisha Silpara
Thakurpukur Rail-line Bazaar

Places of interest
Sonar Durga Temple

Siddheshwari Kali temple

 Douglas Grounds (Oxford Mission)

 State Archaeological Museum, Satyen Roy Road

Adi Shiva Temple, Barisha Silpara

 Sabarna Roy Chowdhury Family houses at Barisha

 Sabarna Sangrahashala, Baro Bari, Barisha
 St. Peter's Church, CNI
12 Temples of Lord Shiva (also known as Dwadash Mandir), more than 350 years old, in Sabarna Para, Sakherbazar

 Behala Gourio Math 
 Behala Gajantala Shitala Mandir.
 Behala AC Market (new Ladies Own)
 Behala Siddeshwari Market (Debnath Electric, the oldest electrical shop in Behala), Homeo pharmacy and many more.

References

External links 

 

Neighbourhoods in Kolkata